John Brennan (born 22 August 1942) is a Gaelic football manager. Labelled as the 'Godfather' of Derry football, Brennan played for his local club Erin's Own Lavey and at senior level for the Derry county team.

In September 2010, Brennan was appointed as the new Derry manager following Damien Cassidy's departure. In the summer of 2012, Brennan stepped down as manager, being succeeded by Brian McIver.

References

1942 births
Living people
Gaelic football managers
Derry inter-county Gaelic footballers
Lavey Gaelic footballers